The Farewell Waltz (French: La valse de l'adieu) is a 1928 French silent biographical film directed by Henry Roussel and starring Pierre Blanchar, Marie Bell and Georges Deneubourg.

Main cast
 Pierre Blanchar as Frédéric Chopin
 Marie Bell as Maria Wodzińska
 Georges Deneubourg as Józef Elsner
 René Maupré as le comte Józef Skarbek
 Germaine Laugier as George Sand
 Jane Irys as Marie d'Agoult
 Georgette Sorelle as la comtesse Wodzińska
 Serge Chatsky as le comte Antoine Wodziński
 Jacques Maury as Franz Liszt
 Zofia Zajączkowska as Delfina Potocka

References

Bibliography
 Charles Timbrell. Prince of Virtuosos: A Life of Walter Rummel, American Pianist. Scarecrow Press, 2005.

External links

1928 films
1920s biographical films
1920s historical films
French biographical films
French historical films
French silent feature films
Films directed by Henry Roussel
Films set in the 19th century
French black-and-white films
Cultural depictions of Frédéric Chopin
Cultural depictions of George Sand
Cultural depictions of Franz Liszt
1920s French films